Serhiy Basov (born 19 January 1987) is a Ukrainian football defender who plays for Metalurh Zaporizhzhia.

Career
Basov is a product of the Zaporizhia youth sportive school systems.

He played in the Ukrainian Second League (FC Tytan Donetsk) and in the Ukrainian First League (FC Zirka Kirovohrad, FC Bukovyna Chernivtsi, FC Oleksandriya) clubs. In Summer 2015 he was promoted with FC Oleksandriya to the Ukrainian Premier League.

References

External links
 
 

1987 births
Living people
People from Artsyz
Ukrainian footballers
FC Tytan Donetsk players
FC Zirka Kropyvnytskyi players
FC Oleksandriya players
FC Bukovyna Chernivtsi players
Ukrainian Premier League players
Association football defenders
Ukrainian expatriate footballers
FC Akzhayik players
FC Atyrau players
FC Metalurh Zaporizhzhia players
Expatriate footballers in Kazakhstan
Ukrainian expatriate sportspeople in Kazakhstan
Sportspeople from Odesa Oblast